The 2021 season was the Oval Invincibles first season of the new franchise 100 ball cricket, The Hundred. The women's team performed well, and eventually won the inaugural competition.

Players

Men's side 
 Bold denotes players with international caps.

Women's side 
 Bold denotes players with international caps.

Regular season

Fixtures (Men)

July

August

Fixtures (Women)

July

August

Standings

Men

 advances to the Final
 advances to the Eliminator

Women

 advances to the Final
 advances to the Eliminator

Knockout stages

Women

Eliminator

Final

References

Cricket clubs established in 2019
2019 establishments in England
The Hundred (cricket)